Dibrugarh–Tambaram Weekly Express is a weekly Express train which connects Dibrugarh railway station in Dibrugarh, Assam, with and  in the South Indian metropolis of Chennai, Tamil Nadu. This train travels a total distance of 3357 km.

Time-Table 
Train no. 15930 from Dibrugarh to Tambaram
Train no. 15929 from Tambaram to Dibrugarh
The train leaves Dibrugarh on every Sunday at 23:45 P.M. and arrives Tambaram on Wednesday at 21:15 P.M. traversing a distance of 3354 kilometres in 69 hours and 30 minutes.

Schedule

Traction

 DBRG -> NCB – SGUJ/WDM-3A
 NCB - > DGP - HWH/WAP-4
 DGP -> VSKP – HWH/WAP-4
 VSKP -> TBM – ED/WAP-4

Major halts

The major halts of this train are as follows-

TAMIL NADU (02 stops)

.

ANDHRA PRADESH  (06 stops)

ODISHA (05 stops)

WEST BENGAL (17 stops)

 

New Jalpaiguri (Siliguri)

.

JHARKHAND (02 stops)

BIHAR (02 stops)

ASSAM (12 stops)

 

Harmuti Junction

.

Reversals

DGR/ and VSKP/.

See also
Nagaon Express
Chennai–New Jalpaiguri Superfast Express
Guwahati–Bengaluru Cantt. Superfast Express
Thiruvananthapuram–Silchar Superfast Express
New Tinsukia–Bengaluru Weekly Express
Bangalore Cantonment–Agartala Humsafar Express

References

Transport in Chennai
Transport in Dibrugarh
Express trains in India
Rail transport in Assam
Rail transport in Tamil Nadu
Rail transport in Andhra Pradesh
Rail transport in Odisha
Rail transport in West Bengal
Rail transport in Jharkhand
Rail transport in Bihar
Rail transport in Nagaland